is a Brazilian school in Oizumi, Gunma which serves kindergarten through 12th grade.

It is accredited by the Brazilian government. As of 2019 the center's director was Midori Inoue.

In 2008 the school had 185 students. In 2007, 45 students who had dropped out of Japanese public schools began attending Nippaku Gakuen.

See also

 List of Brazilian schools in Japan
Japanese schools in Brazil:
 Escola Japonesa de São Paulo
 Associação Civil de Divulgação Cultural e Educacional Japonesa do Rio de Janeiro
 Escola Japonesa de Manaus

References

External links
 INTERESSADO: Instituto Educacional Centro Nippo-Brasileiro de Oizumi, Japão" (Archive).

International schools in Japan
Education in Gunma Prefecture
Elementary schools in Japan
Brazilian international schools
Brazil–Japan relations